Mazzarrà Sant'Andrea is a comune (municipality) in the Metropolitan City of Messina in the Italian region Sicily, located about  east of Palermo and about  southwest of Messina.  
Mazzarrà Sant'Andrea borders the following municipalities: Furnari, Novara di Sicilia, Rodì Milici, Terme Vigliatore, Tripi.

Public transport

Railways 
Novara-Montalbano-Furnari railway station is on the Palermo–Messina railway. It is served by trains run by Trenitalia, including services from Messina.

Bus and tram 
Mazzarrà Sant'Andrea is served by bus provided from Azienda Siciliana Trasporti.

References

External links
 Official website

Cities and towns in Sicily